Purunllacta or Purum Llacta (possibly from Quechua purum, purun savage, wild / wasteland, llaqta place (village, town, city, country, nation) is an archaeological site in Peru. It is situated in the Amazonas Region, Chachapoyas Province, Soloco District, southwest and near the archaeological site of Purum Llaqta of the Cheto District.

See also 
 Machu Pirqa
 Quchapampa

References 

Archaeological sites in Peru
Archaeological sites in Amazonas Region